A breachway is the shore along a channel, or the whole area around the place where a channel meets the ocean.  The Rhode Island coastline has many breachways on its map.  Today's permanent breachways have rock  jetties that line the sides of the channel to protect against erosion or closing of the waterway.  The water channels usually lead to salt water ponds.

External links

Coastal construction
Coastal engineering